The 1941 Colorado College Tigers football team was an American football team represented Colorado College as a member of the Rocky Mountain Conference during the 1941 college football season. In their first and only season under head coach Juan Reid, the team compiled an overall record of 6–2 record with a mark of 4–0 against conference opponents, winning the RMC title for the second consecutive year.

Colorado College players were selected by the Associated Press for five of eleven first-team slots on the 1941 All-Rocky Mountain Conference football team. The five players to receive first-team honors were: senior end Al Ritchie; senior guard Lou Miller; senior center Sog Pantor; junior quarterback Junie Schuler; and junior fullback Bill Singen. Four other Colorado College players were selected for the second team: end Dale Peterson; guard Bernard Wiener; quarterback John Clark; and halfback Tom Pelican. Tackle Henry Elkins was named to the third team.

In May 1942, coach Reid stepped down as the school's head football and basketball coach for military service with the U.S. Army Air Force technical training command.

Schedule

References

Colorado College
Colorado College Tigers football seasons
Colorado College Tigers football